Bodulgate is a house in the parish of St Teath, Cornwall, England, UK.

References

Houses in Cornwall